There are 44 named and countless unnamed lakes in Grand Teton National Park. The largest of these is Jackson Lake, a natural glacial lake that has been enlarged with the construction of the Jackson Lake Dam. The lakes range in size as well as ease of access. In addition to mountain tarns, there are several large peidmont lakes. Nearly all the lakes are glacial in origin, formed by glacial action that carved out the valleys and left moraine behind that acted as dams to lock in water.

The lakes exist in the near pristine wilderness environment of the park, and recreational use, boating and fishing varies by lake. Elevation of the region classes these as alpine lakes, with Jackson lake being the largest alpine lake in the United States.

Overview 

At its formation in 1929, Grand Teton National Park encompassed just six main lakes at the foot of the park's major peaks, but with the expansion of the park there are now 44 named lakes within the boundary, and countless smaller unnamed lakes and ponds. The peaks were raised in relatively recent geological time and carved by glaciers in the ica age. Most of the lakes in the park were formed by glaciers, which carved out the valleys they sit in, and where glacial morraine formed the dams that created the lakes. The largest lakes are still found  at the base of the Teton Range. Though Jackson Lake is natural, the Jackson Lake Dam was constructed at its outlet before the creation of the park, and the lake level was raised almost  consequently. East of the Jackson Lake Lodge lies Emma Matilda and Two Ocean Lakes. South of Jackson Lake, Leigh, Jenny, Bradley, Taggart and Phelps Lakes rest at the outlets of the canyons which lead into the Teton Range. Within the Teton Range, small alpine lakes in cirques are common, and there are more than 100 scattered throughout the high country. The park is not noted for large waterfalls; however,  Hidden Falls just west of Jenny Lake is easy to reach after a short hike.

A 2005 study of the water quality of the lakes in Grand Teton National Park indicated that the lakes in the park were still considered pristine and that they had not been impacted by air or water pollution.

Human history

Paleo-Indian presence along the shores of Jackson Lake is attested from 11,000 years ago in what is now Grand Teton National Park. Jackson Hole valley climate at that time was colder and more alpine than the semi-arid climate found today, and the first humans were migratory hunter-gatherers spending summer months in Jackson Hole and wintering in the valleys west of the Teton Range. Along the shores of Jackson Lake, fire pits, tools, and what are thought to have been fishing weights have been discovered. One of the tools found is of a type associated with the Clovis culture, and tools from this cultural period date back at least 11,500 years. Some of the tools are made of obsidian which chemical analysis indicates came from sources near present-day Teton Pass, south of Grand Teton National Park. Though obsidian was also available north of Jackson Hole, virtually all the obsidian spear points found are from a source to the south, indicating that the main seasonal migratory route for the Paleo-Indian was from this direction. Elk, which winter on the National Elk Refuge at the southern end of Jackson Hole and northwest  into higher altitudes during spring and summer, follow a similar migratory pattern to this day.From 11,000 to about 500 years ago, there is little evidence of change in the migratory patterns amongst the Native American groups in the region and no evidence that indicates any permanent human settlement.

Lake formation 

Some 34 million years ago, the forces of the Laramide orogeny had uplifted a broad part of western Wyoming into a continuous high plateau. This region includes areas now occupied by the Teton Range, Gros Ventre Range, Wind River Mountains and other mountain ranges to the south and east of the Tetons.

Beginning around 13 million years ago in the Miocene, a 40-mile (64-km) long steeply east dipping geological fault system called the Teton Fault began to vertically move two adjacent blocks. One block, the Jackson Hole basin, moved downwards while the other block, containing the westward-tilting eastern part of the Teton Range, moved up, creating the Teton massif. This very recent event in geological time created some of the youngest mountains in North America.

In the most recent glaciation, known as the Pinedale glaciation in the Rocky Mountains (from 30,000 - 10,000 years ago), the greater Teton and Yellowstone region contained one of the largest mountain glacier ice complexes in the western US.  The previous rapid uplift of the Precambrain bedrock of the region and glacial erosion created a dramatic landscape that was carved out by the Pinedale glaciation, leaving significant glacial deposits behind when the ice retreated. The deposits are in the form of moraines, till and outwash. Sediment fill created a region of lakes, creating the natural dams that formed the lakes and also marked the glacial maxima, and marking the glacial retreat.

Recreation

Hiking 

Although some lakes are readily accessible, most can only be reached on foot and some are rarely visited owing to their inaccessibility. 

The park has  of hiking trails, ranging in difficulty from easy to strenuous. The Two Ocean Lake Trail is considered to be a relatively easy lake hike in the Jackson Lake Lodge area. Other easy lake hikes include the Valley Trail which runs from Trapper Lake in the north to the south park boundary near Teton Village and the Jenny Lake Trail which circles the lake.

Boating and fishing 

Grand Teton National Park allows boating on all the lakes in Jackson Hole, but motorized boats can only be used on Jackson and Jenny Lakes. While there is no maximum horsepower limit on Jackson Lake (though there is a noise restriction), Jenny Lake is restricted to 10 horsepower. Only non-motorized boats are permitted on Bearpaw, Bradley, Emma Matilda, Leigh, Phelps, String, Taggart and Two Ocean Lakes. There are four designated boat launches located on Jackson Lake and one on Jenny Lake. Additionally, sailboats, windsurfers, and water skiing are only allowed on Jackson Lake and no jet skis are permitted on any of the park waterways. All boats are required to comply with various safety regulations including personal flotation devices for each passenger. Only non-motorized watercraft are permitted on the Snake River. All other waterways in the park are off limits to boating, and this includes all alpine lakes and tributary streams of the Snake River.

In 2010, Grand Teton National Park started requiring all boats to display an Aquatic Invasive Species decal issued by the Wyoming Game and Fish Department or a Yellowstone National Park boat permit. In an effort to keep the park waterways free of various invasive species such as the Zebra mussel and whirling disease, boaters are expected to abide by certain regulations including displaying a self-certification of compliance on the dashboard of any vehicle attached to an empty boat trailer.

Grand Teton National Park fisheries are managed by the Wyoming Fish and Game Department and a Wyoming state fishing license is required to fish all waterways in Grand Teton National Park. There are also restrictions as to the seasonal accessibility to certain areas as well as the types of bait and fishing tackle permitted.

The Major Lakes 

Six glacial piedmont lakes that lie at the foot of the major peaks of the Tetons were included in the original 1929 boundary of the national park. These were Jenny, Leigh, Bradley, Taggart and Phelps Lakes, along with String Lake although it is not named on the maps. The largest lake, Jackson, was not within the original park boundary. 

{| class="wikitable sortable unsortable" style=" border:solid 1px #999999; margin:0 0 1em 1em;" 
|+Piedmont Lakes
|-
! Lake
! Elevation
! Length
! Width
! Depth
! Coordinates
|-
|Jackson Lake
| 
| 
| 
|
|
|-
|Jenny Lake
| 
| 
| 
|
|
|-
|Leigh Lake
| 
| 
| 
|
|
|-
|Bradley Lake
|
| 
| 
|
|
|-
|Taggart Lake 
|
| 
| 
|.
|
|-
|Phelps Lake
|
| 
| 
|
|
|-
|String Lake
|  
| 
|
|
|
|}

Jackson Lake 

Jackson Lake is the largest lake in the national park. Although not within the original park boundary, the lake was incorporated with the Jackson Hole National Monument into the park in 1943.  It is a reservoir although it was originally a natural glacial lake. The Jackson Lake Dam extends the size of the lake which provides storage of water for irrigation. The lake is fed by the Snake River. The Snake River then flows from there southward through Jackson Hole, exiting the park just west of the Jackson Hole Airport. The largest lakes in the park all drain either directly or by tributary streams into the Snake River.

The water of the lake averages below , even during the summer.

Jenny Lake 

Jenny Lake is one of the most visited places in Grand Teton National Park, and home to the Jenny Lake Visitor Centre. The lake is named after a Shoshone Indian woman who married an Englishman, Richard "Beaver Dick" Leigh. Jenny, and their 6 children, died of Smallpox in 1876.

Boating is permitted on this lake, and a shuttle boat crosses it to access the Hidden Falls and other sights. 

Two lake is fed by inflows from Cascade Creek, and a stream that emanates from String Lake which lies to the north. The catchment areas of lake's inflows span the full elevation gradient of the major peaks.

Leigh Lake 

Leigh Lake was named for Richard "Beaver Dick" Leigh, husband of Jenny Leigh for whom Jenny Lake is named. Leigh was a mountain guide. 

The Leigh Lake Ranger Patrol Cabin is located on the northeast shore of the lake and is on the National Register of Historic Places.

Bradley and Taggart Lakes 

Bradley and Taggart lakes are two of the original six lakes enclosed in the 1929 bark boundary, lying close together. 

Bradley Lake is located near the terminus of Garnet Canyon. Bradley Lake can be accessed by the Bradley Lake Trail, a  roundtrip hike commencing from the Taggart Lake trailhead parking area. The lake was named for Frank Bradley.

Nearby Taggart Lake is located at the terminus of Avalanche Canyon. A number of hiking trails can be found near the lake including a  roundtrip hike commencing from the Taggart Lake Trailhead parking area. 

Taggart lake was named after William Rush Taggart, an assistant surveyor to Frank Bradley as part of the Snake River division of the Hayden expedition of 1872 to document the geology and topography of the Yellowstone area.

Phelps Lake 

Phelps Lake was mostly included within the original park boundaries, and the remainder of the lake was incorporated with the  inclusion of the Jackson Hole National Monument into the park in 1943. It is located at the entrance to Death Canyon in the southern section of the park. A number of hiking trails can be found near the lake, the most popular being a 1.8 mile (2.9 km) roundtrip hike to the Phelps Lake overlook.

String Lake 

Although not specifically named, String Lake was the sixth piedmont lake at the base of the main peaks that was included in the original 1929 park boundary.

The lake is located at the outflow of Leigh Lake. A small wetland area is on the northwest side of the lake and is prime moose habitat. A short half mile (.8 km) long creek connects String Lake to Jenny Lake to the south. The lake can easily be accessed by vehicle and a number of trails commence from the String Lake trailhead parking area.

Other Lakes 

{| class="wikitable sortable unsortable" style=" border:solid 1px #999999; margin:0 0 1em 1em;" 
|+Minor Named Lakes and Tarns
|-
! Lake
! Elevation
! Length
! Width
! Depth
! Coordinates
|-
|Amphitheater Lake
|
|
|
|
|
|-
|Bearpaw Lake
|
|
|
|
|
|-

|-
|Cirque Lake
|
|
|
|
|
|-
|Cow Lake
|
|
|
|
|
|-
|Coyote Lake
|
|
|
|
|
|-
|Crater Lake
|
|
|
|
|
|-
|Delta Lake
|
|
|
|
|
|-
|Dudley Lake
|
|
|
|
|
|-
|Elk Ranch Reservoir
|
|
|
|
|
|-
|Emma Matilda Lake
|
|
|
|
|
|-
|Forget-me-not Lakes
|
|
|
|
|
|-
|Grizzly Bear Lake 
|
|
|
|
|
|-
|Halfmoon Lake
|
|
|
|
|
|-
|Hechtman Lake
|
|
|
|
|
|-
|Holly Lake
|
|
|
|
|
|-
|Icefloe Lake
|
|
|
|
|
|-
|Indian Lake
|
|
|
|
|
|-
|Kit Lake
|
|
|
|
|
|-
|Lake of the Crags
|
|
|
|
|
|-
|Lake Solitude
|
|
|
|
|
|-
|Lake Taminah
|
|
|
|
|
|-
|Laurel Lake
|
|
|
|
|
|-
|Marion Lake
|
|
|
|
|
|-
|Mica Lake
|
|
|
|
|
|-
|Mink Lake
|
|
|
|
|
|-

|Moran Lake
|
|
|
|
|
-->
|- 
|Ortenburger Lake (not  official)
|
|
|
|
|
|- 
|Pass Lake
|
|
|
|
|
|-
|Ramshead Lake
|
|
|
|
|
|-
|Rimrock Lake
|
|
|
|
|
|-
|Ski Lake
|
|
|
|
|
|-
|Snowdrift Lake
|
|
|
|
|
|-
|Surprise Lake
|
|
|
|
|
|-
|Swan Lake
|
|
|
|
|
|-
|Talus Lake
|
|
|
|
|
|-
|Timberline Lake
|
|
|
|
|
|-
|Trapper Lake
|
|
|
|
|
|-
|Two Ocean Lake
|
|
|
|
|
|}

Greater Lake District named lakes

Bearpaw Lake  

Bearpaw Lake lies to the north of Leigh Lake at the eastern base of Mount Moran and snow and glacier meltwaters off Skillet Glacier eventually feed into the lake. There are three backcountry camping sites with designated tent pads at the lake and a backcountry permit is required to use these sites.

Amphitheater Lake

Christian Pond

Cirque Lake

Cow Lake

Coyote Lake

Delta Lake

Dudley Lake 

The lake was discovered in 1932 by park ranger Dudley Hayden. Following his death in 1969, the Jackson Hole Historical Society passed a resolution to rename Hanging Lake to Dudley Lake in his honor. Support for the name change came from then Governor Stan Hathaway, US Senators Gale McGee and Clifford Hansen, and US Congressman John S. Wold. The lake was officially renamed Dudley Lake by the Department of the Interior in 1970.{{efn|Renamed in decision list 7004 by the US Board of Geographic Names

Elk Ranch Reservoir

Emma Matilda Lake

Forget-me-not Lakes

Grizzly Bear Lake

Holly Lake

Icefloe Lake

Indian Lake

Kit Lake

Lake of the Crags

Laurel Lake

Marion Lake

Mica Lake

Mink Lake

Ramshead Lake

Rimrock Lake

Snowdrift Lake

Lake Solitude

Surprise Lake

Talus Lake

Lake Taminah

Timberline Lake

Trapper Lake

Two Ocean Lake 
-->

See also

 Grand Teton National Park
 List of national parks of the United States
 List of lakes of Wyoming

Notes

References

Sources

External links 
 Grand Teton Association
 

 
Greater Yellowstone Ecosystem
National parks in Wyoming
National parks of the Rocky Mountains
Protected areas established in 1929
Teton County, Wyoming
Tourist attractions in Teton County, Wyoming